Bento Martins de Meneses, the Baron of Ijuí was a Brazilian Brigadier General who was most notable for his participation of the final battle of the Paraguayan War, the Battle of Miranda.

Biography
He joined the former . After participating in the Ragamuffin War and the conflicts with Uruguay in 1851 and 1852, he was promoted to the rank of lieutenant colonel. He moved to Uruguaiana, where, at the time of the Paraguayan War, he formed the 17th Cavalry Regiment, which faced Antonio de la Cruz Estigarribia's troops and supported the families who took refuge in Alegrete. After the war, he was promoted to Brigadier General.

The manor where he lived is a tourist spot in Uruguaiana.

References

External Links
A Page of The Brazilian Nobility from A to Z

1818 births
1881 deaths
Brazilian generals
Brazilian military personnel of the Paraguayan War
People from Rio Grande do Sul
Brazilian nobility